Hudson Lake is an unincorporated community and census-designated place (CDP) in Hudson Township, LaPorte County, Indiana, United States. The town sits on the dividing line between Central and Eastern time zones. It is the site of the Hudson Lake station stop of the South Shore Line. As of the 2010 census, the population of the CDP was 1,297.

Hudson Lake was originally called "Lakeport", and under the latter name was settled by 1833.

Geography
The community surrounds a natural water body of the same name. While most of the residences are on the north and east sides of the lake, the census-designated place includes the neighborhood of Lake Park on the south side. The South Shore rail line runs along the southern side of the Hudson Lake water body, leading east  to South Bend and west  to Michigan City.

Demographics

Transportation

Hudson Lake is served by interurban commuter rail on the South Shore Line. Trains from Hudson Lake Station run to and from Chicago westward, and to and from nearby South Bend eastward. This allows residents of the area to commute into the two larger cities.

References

Census-designated places in LaPorte County, Indiana
Census-designated places in Indiana